NGC 40 (also known as the Bow-Tie Nebula and Caldwell 2) is a planetary nebula discovered by William Herschel on November 25, 1788, and is composed of hot gas around a dying star. The star has ejected its outer layer which has left behind a smaller, hot star with a temperature on the surface of about 50,000 degrees Celsius. Radiation from the star causes the shed outer layer to heat to about 10,000 degrees Celsius, and is about one light-year across. About 30,000 years from now, scientists theorize that NGC 40 will fade away, leaving only a white dwarf star approximately the size of Earth.

Morphologically, the shape of NGC 40 resembles a barrel with the long axis pointing towards the north-northeast. There are two additional pairs of lobes around the poles, which correspond to additional ejections from the star.

Currently the central star of NGC 40 has a spectral type of [WC8], indicating a spectrum similar to that of a carbon-rich Wolf–Rayet star.

Gallery

References

External links 
 
 
 
 

NGC 0040
NGC 0040
0040
002b
17881125
Discoveries by William Herschel